Jan Eugeniusz Krysiński  (born 17 August 1935 in Warsaw) is a Polish scientist, specializing in fluid mechanics and turbomachinery research, and former rector of Lodz University of Technology.

Krysiński is a graduate of General Secondary School number three under the patronage of Tadeusz Kosciuszko in Lodz. In 1957 he completed his studies at the Technical University of Lodz, where he then started his scientific work. Since that time, he has remained employed at the university. He defended his PhD dissertation in 1965 and habilitation in 1975. In 1980 he was awarded the title of a professor in technical sciences. Since 1991 he has held the position of a full professor.
Between 1987-1990 he was the Dean of the Faculty of Mechanical Engineering. He was elected Rector of TUL four times in the years 1990-1993-1996 and 2002-2005-2008.

He specializes in research on turbines, gas bearings and renewable energy. He has published more than 80 scientific papers.
In 2009, in the elections to the European Parliament he unsuccessfully ran for the deputy mandate from the list of the Civic Platform in the district of Lodz.

Honours and awards

He was awarded, among others, the Knight's Cross (1980), the Commander’s Cross (1995) and the Commander’s with Star Cross (2005), the Order of Polonia Restituta, the French Knight's Orders of Academic Palms and the Legion of Honour (1995 and 2005). He was honored with the titles of doctor honoris causa by the University of Strathclyde in Glasgow (1992), the Polytechnic University of Saint Petersburg (2003), the Jean Moulin University Lyon 3 (2004), the University of Coventry (2005) and the University of Technology in Bielsko-Biala (2005).

Selected publications

 Jan Krysiński (co-author), Low-power Gas Turbines, Ed. Scientific and Technical, 1963.
 Jan Krysiński (co-author), Handbook of Mechanical Engineer Ed. Scientific and Technical, 1969 (two chapters).
 Jan Krysiński (co-author), Gas Bearings and Microturbine Drive, Ed. Scientific and Technical, 1981.
 Jan Krysiński, Turbomachines - théorie générale. Of . des Publications Universitaires, Algiers in 1986 and 1995.

References

Bibliography
 
 
 

1935 births
20th-century Polish physicists
Scientists from Warsaw
Łódź University of Technology alumni
Commanders with Star of the Order of Polonia Restituta
Knights of the Order of Polonia Restituta
Recipients of the Ordre des Palmes Académiques
Living people
Recipients of the Legion of Honour
Academic staff of Łódź University of Technology